
Fritz Becker (7 March 1892  – 11 June 1967) was a general in the Wehrmacht of Nazi Germany during World War II who held commands at divisional and corps levels. He was a recipient of the Knight's Cross of the Iron Cross.

Awards and decorations

 German Cross in Gold on 22 November 1941 as Oberst in Infanterie-Regiment 60 (motorized)
 Knight's Cross of the Iron Cross on  6 April 1943 as Generalmajor and commander of 370. Infanterie-Division

References

Citations

Bibliography

 
 

1892 births
1967 deaths
Military personnel from Heidelberg
People from the Grand Duchy of Baden
Lieutenant generals of the German Army (Wehrmacht)
German Army personnel of World War I
Recipients of the clasp to the Iron Cross, 1st class
Recipients of the Gold German Cross
Recipients of the Knight's Cross of the Iron Cross
German prisoners of war in World War II held by the United Kingdom
20th-century Freikorps personnel
German Army generals of World War II